Tour de Force is a 2014 German drama film directed by Christian Zübert, produced by Florian Gallenberger and Benjamin Herrmann. It was screened in the Contemporary World Cinema section at the 2014 Toronto International Film Festival and in the Grand Piazzia Section of the Locarno International Film Festival.

Cast
 Florian David Fitz as Hannes
 Julia Koschitz as Kiki
 Jürgen Vogel as Michael
 Miriam Stein as Sabine
 Volker Bruch as Finn
 Johannes Allmayer as Dominik
 Victoria Mayer as Mareike
 Hannelore Elsner as Irene

Awards
Florian David Fitz received the Jupiter Award 2015 as Best Actor.

Reviews
Indiewire wrote: "There have been a lot of narrative features and documentaries made on euthanasia, but “Tour De Force” manages to become a unique and emotionally immersive experience on the subject by sidestepping all of the surrounding political controversy and focusing entirely on the psychological and spiritual effects the practice has on people. It's a powerful experience that's remarkably tender and human, equally heartbreaking and life affirming. “Tour De Force” is a powerful drama about the value of life, friendship, and love, as well as the inevitable grieving process one has to survive upon the loss of a loved one."

References

External links
 

2014 films
2014 drama films
German drama films
2010s German-language films
2010s German films